Camenca is a commune in Glodeni District, Moldova. It is composed of four villages: Brînzeni, Butești, Camenca and Molești.

Notable people
 Vasile Coroban

References

Communes of Glodeni District